In July 1973, the Soviet Union purchased  of grain (mainly wheat and  corn) from the United States at subsidized prices, which caused global grain prices to soar. Crop shortfalls in 1971 and 1972 forced the Soviet Union to look abroad for grain. Hoping to prevent famine or other crisis, Soviet negotiators worked out a deal to buy grain on credit, but quickly exceeded their credit limit. American negotiators did not realize that both the Soviets and the world grain market had suffered shortfalls, and thus subsidized the purchase, leading it to be dubbed the "Great Grain Robbery". The strategy backfired and intensified the crisis: global food prices rose at least 30 percent, and grain stockpiles were decimated.

Background 

Due to the Soviet agricultural system, the cold climate, and frequent irregular droughts, crop failure was common in the Soviet Union. The problem was heightened by the fact that much of the arable land in the USSR couldn't be farmed due to climate problems, so only some of the land in the black earth belt was suitable for agriculture.

In 1972, there was a drought across Europe. Soviet mismanagement of the situation led to catastrophic wheat crop failure. Additionally, the USSR had suffered an extremely hot summer with temperature comparable to the heat experienced during 2010 Northern Hemisphere heat waves. This caused the Soviet Union to look to the global market to meet their grain needs.

Event

The main negotiations for the deal took place on June 20, 1972, at The Madison hotel in Washington, D.C., with two Soviet teams, one led by foreign trade minister Nikolai Patolichev and the second led by Nicolai Belousov. The Americans were negotiated for by multiple businessman and U.S. government officials. This included Michel Fribourg, the CEO of grain trading firm ContiGroup Companies (formerly Continental Grain), and Carroll Brunthaver, the U.S. Under Secretary of Agriculture for Farm and Foreign Agricultural Services. In early July 1972, the U.S. government negotiated an arrangement that allowed the Soviets to buy up to $750 million of American grain on credit, over a three-year timespan. However, the Soviets quickly exceeded their credit limit, spending the $750 million in only one month. By September 1972, the Soviets are thought to have spent up to US$1 billion on grain from companies in the United States, and more from other countries such as France, Canada, and Australia.

The U.S. government spent $300 million subsidizing the grain purchases, still unaware that the Soviets had suffered massive crop shortfalls in 1971 and 1972. American ignorance of the situation was due in part that many officials, such as Earl Butz, were convinced that the Soviets were only purchasing the grain to feed their animals. By not realizing that global wheat stocks were low, and discounting reports of Soviet crop failure, the United States inadvertently contributed to domestic food prices rising, and lost significant revenue by choosing to subsidize the purchase instead of offering it at market price.

Aftermath and international consequences 
Weeks after the grain deal was announced, the Earth-observing satellite Landsat 1 achieved orbit. If the satellite had launched a few months earlier, the deal may have been reconsidered or never have happened at all, because American negotiators could have realized the scale of Soviet crop failures. The event helped lead the U.S. government to seek more information about global agricultural output via infrared satellite intelligence. After the deal, many Americans were concerned about businesses having advantages in similar situations due to their early access to information. 

In a ten-month span in 1973, global food prices rose by at least 30 percent and some sources claim up to 50 percent. In some British markets there was a reported 87 percent increase on the price of an  loaf of bread. Global wheat stocks decreased exponentially; Australia was hit the hardest with a 93 percent decrease by 1974 from 1971. Not all nations were equally hit; some, such as Canada, benefited from the deal. Canadian farmers had sold their wheat to the Canadian Wheat Board, which were able to pool stocks and sell as a collective.

Contemporary U.S. media referred to the event as "The Russian Wheat Deal" or "The Soviet Wheat Deal". The term Great Grain Robbery is a pun referring to the 1963 Great Train Robbery and it is generally accepted that it was coined by Senator Henry M. Jackson.

References

Further reading

 

1972 in the United States
Soviet Union–United States relations
Agricultural subsidies
United States agricultural policy
Foreign trade of the Soviet Union
1972 in the Soviet Union
Grain trade